The pentakis snub dodecahedron is a convex polyhedron with 140 triangular faces, 210 edges, and 72 vertices. It has chiral icosahedral symmetry.

Construction
It comes from a topological construction from the snub dodecahedron with the kis operator applied to the pentagonal faces. In this construction, all the faces are computed to be the same distance from the center. 80 of the triangles are equilateral, and 60 triangles from the pentagons are isosceles.
It is a (2,1) geodesic polyhedron, made of all triangles. The path between the valence-5 vertices is two edges in a row, and then a turn and one more edge.

See also 
Tetrakis snub cube k4sC

References 

 John H. Conway, Heidi Burgiel, Chaim Goodman-Strauss, The Symmetries of Things 2008, 
 Chapter 21: Naming the Archimedean and Catalan polyhedra and Tilings (p 284)
  Dover 1999

External links 
 Pentakis snub dodecahedron
 VTML polyhedral generator Try "k5sD" (Conway polyhedron notation)

Geodesic polyhedra
Snub tilings